Andrea Rosso (born 19 October 2003) is an Italian racing driver, who currently competes for Race Performance Motorsport in the Formula Regional European Championship. He is the inaugural FIA Motorsport Games Formula 4 Cup champion, as well as an Italian F4 Championship race winner.

Career

Karting 
Rosso first drove a kart in 2007, aged 4, but did not start competing until a few years later. Coming up through the ranks in his native Italy before making the move to Europe, he won the prestigious Trofeo Andrea Margutti twice in consecutive years, first in OK-Junior in 2017 and then in OK in 2018. He also became the 2017 WSK Super Master Series champion in the OK-Junior class, beating the likes of Jack Doohan, Jonny Edgar and Roman Staněk. At the end of 2018, his last full season of competitive karting, Rosso was invited to participate in the 15th edition of the annual Supercorso Federale event at Vallelunga, as one of four young karting talents selected by ACI Sport.

Lower formulae 
Rosso made his single-seater debut in the 2019 Italian F4 Championship, where he competed in four of the seven rounds for Antonelli Motorsport. He scored two points and ended the season 25th in the standings, while also taking a podium in the rookies' championship. That year, the Italian also took part in the Formula 4 Cup of the inaugural FIA Motorsport Games at Vallelunga. He won the main race after qualifying third and gaining a position in each of the races, and earned himself and his country a gold medal on home soil.

In 2020 Rosso switched to Cram Motorsport for a full season of Italian F4. He enjoyed a strong start to the campaign, and was well within the title fight alongside Gabriele Minì and Francesco Pizzi at the halfway point, having won three of the first ten races. However, a poor second half of the season followed, with a run of retirements, non-points finishes and even a DNS from pole at Monza eventually dropping him to seventh in the drivers' championship. At the end of the year, Rosso was again invited to ACI Sport's Supercorso Federale, together with Minì, Pizzi, Leonardo Fornaroli and four karting drivers. He received the Trofeo Cristiano del Balzo, awarded to the driver who showed more "commitment and passion".

Formula Regional European Championship 
In March 2021 it was announced that Rosso would be making his debut in the Formula Regional European Championship, driving for Fernando Alonso's FA Racing team. He managed a best result of fifth at the Circuit Paul Ricard and finished 19th in the standings.

Retirement 
Having initially tested a Honda NSX GT3 Evo during the winter in evaluation of a move to sportscar racing, Rosso announced his immediate retirement from racing on 2 April 2022, after 14 years of competing in karting and single-seaters. He stated that "the passion for this sport literally overwhelmed [him]".

Return 
Only three months after announcing his retirement, Rosso returned to FRECA, having been called up by RPM for the sixth round at the Hungaroring as a replacement for driver-team manager Keith Donegan, who stepped back from his double duties.

Karting record

Karting career summary

Racing record

Racing career summary 

* Season still in progress.

Complete Italian F4 Championship results 
(key) (Races in bold indicate pole position) (Races in italics indicate fastest lap)

Complete FIA Motorsport Games results

Complete Formula Regional European Championship results 
(key) (Races in bold indicate pole position) (Races in italics indicate fastest lap)

* Season still in progress.

References

External links 
 
 

2003 births
Living people
Italian racing drivers
Formula Regional European Championship drivers
MP Motorsport drivers
Italian F4 Championship drivers
FA Racing drivers
FIA Motorsport Games drivers
Cram Competition drivers
Karting World Championship drivers